The 1916 North Dakota gubernatorial election was held on November 7, 1916. Republican nominee Lynn Frazier defeated Democratic nominee D. H. McArthur with 79.24% of the vote.

Primary elections
Primary elections were held on June 28, 1916.

Democratic primary

Candidates
D. H. McArthur
L. H. Platou
Halvor L. Halvorson, former President of the Minot City Commission

Results

Republican primary

Candidates
Lynn Frazier, farmer
Usher L. Burdick, former Lieutenant Governor
John H. Fraine, incumbent Lieutenant Governor
George J. Smith

Results

General election

Candidates
Major party candidates
Lynn Frazier, Republican
D. H. McArthur, Democratic

Other candidates
Oscar A. Johnson, Socialist

Results

References

1916
North Dakota
Gubernatorial